The Three Parallel Rivers of Yunnan Protected Areas is a UNESCO World Heritage Site in Yunnan province, China. It lies within the drainage basins of the upper reaches of the Jinsha (Yangtze), Lancang (Mekong) and Nujiang (Salween) rivers, in the Yunnan section of the Hengduan Mountains.

Overview

Geography
The protected areas extend over 15 core areas, totalling 939,441.4 ha, and buffer areas, totalling 758,977.8 ha across a region of 180 km by 310 km. Here, for a distance of over 300 km, three of Asia's great rivers run roughly parallel to one another though separated by high mountain ranges with peaks over 6,000 meters. After this area of near confluence, the rivers greatly diverge: the Nujiang River becomes Salween and empties out at Moulmein, Burma, into the Indian Ocean, the Lancang becomes the Mekong and south of Ho Chi Minh City, Vietnam, empties out into the South China Sea and the Yangtze flows into the East China Sea at Shanghai. Selected nature reserves and places of scenic beauty in this unique region were collectively awarded World Heritage Site status in 2003 for their very rich biodiversity and outstanding topographical diversity.

Running parallel to these three rivers, but to the west inside Burma, is the river gorge of the N'Mai river, the main tributary to the Irrawaddy River.

Biology
In its description, UNESCO mentions: "(It) may be the most biologically diverse temperate region on earth" and "An exceptional range of topographical features - from gorges to karst to glaciated peaks -- is associated with the site being at a 'collision point' of tectonic plates".

Due to its topography and geographical location, the Three Parallel Rivers region contains many climate types. Average annual precipitation ranges from 4,600 mm in the Dulongjian area in the west of Gongshan county to 300 mm in the upper valleys of the Yangtze river.  The protected areas are home to around 6,000 species of plants, 173 species of mammals, and 417 species of birds. Many of the flora and fauna species are endemic to the region.

Culture
Although this region has been acknowledged as a natural World Heritage Site, its demographic make-up also is highly interesting as it contains many of the twenty-five minorities found in Yunnan province including the Derung, the smallest of all of China's minority groups. Some of the other minorities found in this region are the Tibetan people, the Nu people, Lisu, Bai, Pumi and Naxi. Many of these minorities still use traditional costumes as their normal daily attire.

In the same region as the Three Parallel Rivers of Yunnan Protected Areas lies the Old Town of Lijiang, which is also a World Heritage Site in its own right.

Protected areas

The Three Parallel Rivers of Yunnan Protected Areas consists of fifteen protected areas, in eight geographic clusters. The areas include:

 The three separate sections of the Gaoligongshan National Nature Reserve
 Haba Xueshan Nature Reserve, with the Tiger Leaping Gorge
 Bita Lake Nature Reserve, part of Pudacuo National Park, in Shangri-La County
 Yunling Nature Reserve
 Gongshan Scenic Area
 Yueliangshan Scenic Area in Fugong County (also known as Stone Moon mountain)
 Pianma Scenic Area in Lushui County
 Julong Lake Scenic Area, in Deqin County
 Laowoshan Scenic Area, in Fugong County
 Hongshan Scenic Area, part of Pudacuo National Park in Shangri-La County
 Qianhushan (Thousand Lake Mountain) Scenic Area, in Shangri-La County
 Laojunshan Scenic Area, in Lanping Bai and Pumi Autonomous County

Flora and fauna

According to UNESCO "The area covered by the World Heritage site is claimed to be the most biodiverse and least disturbed temperate ecosystems in the world".
Flora
The protected terrestrial ecoregion areas of this biodiversity hotspot are for a large part covered with both temperate coniferous and broadleaf forests. The protected areas are home to around 6,000 species of plants, many of which are endemic to the region.  More than 200 varieties of rhododendron and more than 100 species of gentians and primulas are found in the areas.

Fauna
The fauna found in the areas includes 173 species of mammals, of which 81 are endemic, and 417 species of birds, of which 22 are endemic. Some of the mammals which inhabit these regions are the endemic black snub-nosed monkey, the Indian leopard, snow leopard, and clouded leopard; the Gaoligong pika, Gongshan muntjac, Chinese shrew mole, and capped langur; the stump-tailed macaque, Asiatic wild dog, black musk deer, and takin; the smooth-coated otter, hoolock gibbon, Asian black bear and red panda.

Rare bird species in the areas include chestnut-throated partridge, the Lady Amherst's pheasant, white-eared pheasant, Yunnan nuthatch, and giant nuthatch; the white-speckled laughingthrush, ferruginous duck, Severtzov's grouse, and brown-winged parrotbill; the Ward's trogon, black-necked crane and Verreaux's monal-partridge.

See also
Chushi Gangdruk
List of ecoregions in China
Temperate broadleaf and mixed forest - terrestrial biome
Temperate coniferous forest - terrestrial biome
List of World Heritage Sites in Asia
Episode "Shangri-La" of the BBC nature documentary Wild China
Pierre Jean Marie Delavay, a French Catholic missionary and botanist who explored the region in the late 19th century
Joseph Rock, Austrian-American explorer and botanist who described the region in "Through the Great River Trenches of Asia: National Geographic Society Explorer Follows the Yangtze, Mekong, and Salwin Through Mighty Gorges" (1926)

References

External links

World-Heritage-Site.org: Three Parallel Rivers Of Yunnan Protected Areas
Earth.org: "Three Parallel Rivers Of Yunnan Protected Areas" article
 UNep-wcmc.org - Three Rivers of Yunnan

World Heritage Sites in China
Biosphere reserves of China
Landforms of Yunnan
Geography of Dêqên Tibetan Autonomous Prefecture
Geography of Nujiang Lisu Autonomous Prefecture
Geography of Lijiang
Canyons and gorges of China
Valleys of China
Forests of China
Old-growth forests
Yangtze River
Mekong River
Salween River
Tourist attractions in Yunnan
Temperate broadleaf and mixed forests
Temperate coniferous forests
Ecoregions of China
Freshwater ecoregions
National parks of China